Leopold Linhart (born 29 July 1914, date of death unknown) was an Austrian figure skater. He competed in the men's singles event at the 1936 Winter Olympics.

References

1914 births
Year of death missing
Austrian male single skaters
Olympic figure skaters of Austria
Figure skaters at the 1936 Winter Olympics
Figure skaters from Vienna